Lachesilla texana is a species of fateful barklouse in the family Lachesillidae.

References

Further reading

External links

 

Lachesillidae
Insects described in 2010